Horatio Jones may refer to:

 Buck Jones (American football) (Horatio Jones, 1888–1985), NFL football player, 1922
 Horatio Jones (1763–1836), pioneer in Western New York
 Horatio M. Jones (1826–1906), Justice of the Territorial Supreme Court of Nevada
 Horatio Jones house, house in Tecoma, Victoria, Australia built from kerosene cans